Vonani Bila is a South African author and poet, he was born in 1972 in Shirley Village near Elim Hospital. He is the founder and editor of the poetry journal Timbila and directs the Timbila Poetry Project in Shirley Village, Elim in Limpopo Province. He works as the co-ordinator of the Limpopo NGO Coalition and edits the newspaper Community Gazette. He has written eight story books in English and Tsonga for newly literate adult readers. His poetry has been published in the collection No Free Sleeping. In 2003 Vonani Bila released his first music and poetry CD, 'Dahl Street, Pietersburg'. Bila participated in the 'Poetry Africa 2005', an International festival of poetry held in Durban, South Africa.

Education
Vonani Bila started his education at Shirley Primary School at his home village of Shirley, he proceeded to do his secondary education at Lemana High School at  Village near Elim Hospital. After Lemana high school, he attended the University of Natal. He holds MA in Creative Writing  from Rhodes University

References

External links
 Bio details, Poetry Africa Festival 2005
 Volani is honnored and invited to 12e Biennale des poètes en Val-de-Marne, FRANCE

1972 births
Living people
People from Vhembe District Municipality
Tsonga people
South African poets